Juan Lizariturry Setién (born 20 April 1991) is a Spanish professional tennis player playing on the ATP Challenger Tour. On 14 July 2014, he reached his highest ATP singles ranking of 304 and his highest doubles ranking of 360 achieved on 11 August 2014.

Tour titles

Doubles

External links
 

1991 births
Living people
Spanish male tennis players
Tennis players from the Basque Country (autonomous community)
Sportspeople from San Sebastián